The Battersea Park funfair disaster happened in Battersea Park, London, on 30 May 1972; five children died and thirteen others were injured when a wooden roller coaster train came off its tracks. The ride manager and engineer were subsequently tried for and acquitted of manslaughter.

Accident
The accident occurred on the afternoon of Tuesday 30 May 1972 on the 'Big Dipper' roller coaster at the funfair in Battersea Park, London, which had opened in 1951 as part of the Festival of Britain. A train being hoisted up to the start of the ride broke loose from its haulage rope. The emergency rollback brake failed, causing the carriages to roll backwards towards the station. Despite the efforts of the brakeman, the train gathered speed and the back carriage jumped the rails and crashed through a barrier with the other two carriages crashing on top of it. Five children were killed and thirteen others injured.

After the accident, the roller coaster was closed and dismantled. With the funfair's lack of a main attraction its use soon declined, leading to its closure in 1974. Very little remains now to even suggest that a funfair once stood on the site.

The Independent newspaper published a story in 2015 recalling the accident, prompted by an accident at Alton Towers in which 16 people were injured, four seriously. Regarding the 1972 accident, Carolyn Adamczyk, a passenger on the ride during the accident, said: "As soon as we started shooting backwards everything went into slow motion... I turned around and saw the brake man desperately trying to put the brake on but it wasn’t working. Most of the carriages didn’t go around the bend, one detached and went off the side through a wooden hoarding. People were groaning and hanging over the edge. It was awful."

The BBC News website published a video article in April 2022 about survivors of the disaster campaigning for a permanent memorial to the incident. The footage includes film footage of the rollercoaster in operation as well as modern views of the site where it stood, and mentions a theory that the wood from the demolished coaster is buried under Battersea Park.

Criminal trial

Three men were charged with manslaughter and a committal hearing was started at Wandsworth Magistrates' Court on  26 February 1973. The court heard that, after a fire had damaged the ride in 1970, second-hand stock, more than fifty years old, had been bought to replace it. The dog brake on this train had not operated when the rope broke, allowing it to run backwards. Additionally, the structure, including the pedestrian emergency walkway, was in a rotted and unsafe condition so that one victim who survived the initial impact fell through the handrail to her death. 

The manager of the ride and its inspecting engineer were committed for trial. After a lengthy hearing at the Old Bailey, on 20 November 1973 both men were acquitted. They were defended by George Carman  and Lewis Hawser , respectively.

References

External links
I Survived London's Big Dipper Crash (2013) Open.abc.net.au (archived 2015)

1972 disasters in the United Kingdom
1972 disestablishments in England
1972 in London
Amusement park accidents
Battersea
Disasters in London
May 1972 events in the United Kingdom
Roller coasters that closed in 1972